Rösti, a Swiss potato dish
 Adolf Rösti, Swiss alpine skier 
 Albert Rösti, Swiss entrepreneur, association official, national chairman of the Swiss People's Party, and a member of the Swiss National Council

See also 

 Roeşti, Romanian commune
 Rosti
Roti